Scopula variabilis is a moth of the  family Geometridae. It is found in Angola, Cameroon, the Democratic Republic of Congo, Kenya and Uganda.

References

Moths described in 1878
variabilis
Insects of the Democratic Republic of the Congo
Insects of Uganda
Insects of Angola
Moths of Africa